Between the Trees is a 2011 short story collection by Icelandic author Gyrðir Elíasson. It won the Nordic Council's Literature Prize in 2011.

References

2011 short story collections
Icelandic short story collections
Nordic Council's Literature Prize-winning works